The 2007 Royal London Watches Grand Prix was a professional ranking snooker tournament that took place between 13 and 21 October 2007 at the A.E.C.C. in Aberdeen, Scotland.

Dave Harold made 14 consecutive  during his round-robin stage match against Liu Song. This is the most consecutive foul and misses made in any professional event.

Marco Fu won the title by defeating Ronnie O'Sullivan 9–6 in the final.

Prize fund
The breakdown of prize money for this year is shown below: 

Winner: £75,000
Runner-up: £35,000
Semi-final: £20,000
Quarter-final: £11,000
Last 16: £7,000
Main stage:
3rd in group: £5,200
4th in group: £5,000
5th in group: £4,750
6th in group: £4,500

Qualifying stage:
3rd–4th in group: £3,000
5th–6th in group: £500
7th–8th in group: £250
Qualifying stage highest break: £500
Televised stage highest break: £4,000
Qualifying stage maximum break: £1,000
Televised stage maximum break: £20,000
Total: £470,500

Ranking points
The breakdown of ranking points for this year is shown below:

Winner: 6,250
Runner-up: 5,000
Semi-final: 4,000
Quarter-final: 3,125
Last 16: 2,376
Main stage:
3rd–4th in group: 1,750
5th–6th in group: 719
 
Qualifying stage:
1st–2nd in group: 1,438
3rd–4th in group: 1,125
5th–6th in group: 813
7th–8th in group: 250

Main draw

Round-robin stage
The first round used a round-robin format like last season.  The top 32 and the 16 qualifiers were placed in eight groups of six with the top two from each group qualifying for the knockout stage. Matches in the round-robins were the best of seven frames.

Tom Ford made a maximum break in his match against Steve Davis. For this feat he won £24,000.

Group 2A

13 October:
Neil Robertson 2–4 Jimmy Michie
Stephen Lee 2–4 Joe Swail
Joe Perry 4–1 Mark Davis
Neil Robertson 4–2 Mark Davis
Stephen Lee 3–4 Joe Perry
Joe Swail 4–3 Jimmy Michie

14 October:
Neil Robertson 4–0 Joe Perry
Stephen Lee 0–4 Jimmy Michie
Joe Swail 4–0 Mark Davis
Neil Robertson 2–4 Joe Swail
Stephen Lee 4–2 Mark Davis
Joe Perry 4–2 Jimmy Michie

16 October:
Neil Robertson 2–4 Stephen Lee
Joe Perry 4–2 Joe Swail
Mark Davis 4–1 Jimmy Michie

Group 2B

13 October:
Ronnie O'Sullivan 4–0 Mark Joyce
Steve Davis 0–4 Gerard Greene
Dominic Dale 4–3 Tom Ford
Ronnie O'Sullivan 4–3 Tom Ford
Steve Davis 4–3 Dominic Dale
Gerard Greene 4–2 Mark Joyce

14 October:
Ronnie O'Sullivan 4–0 Dominic Dale
Mark Joyce 3–4 Steve Davis
Gerard Greene 4–3 Tom Ford
Ronnie O'Sullivan 4–2 Gerard Greene
Steve Davis 0–4 Tom Ford
Dominic Dale 4–2 Mark Joyce

15 October:
Ronnie O'Sullivan 4–1 Steve Davis
Dominic Dale 0–4 Gerard Greene
Tom Ford 4–3 Mark Joyce

Group 2C

13 October:
Peter Ebdon 4–3 Liu Song
Mark Selby 2–4 Dave Harold
Matthew Stevens 4–3 Joe Delaney
Peter Ebdon 4–3 Joe Delaney
Mark Selby 2–4 Matthew Stevens
Dave Harold 1–4 Liu Song

14 October:
Peter Ebdon 4–1 Matthew Stevens
Mark Selby 4–1 Liu Song
Dave Harold 4–1 Joe Delaney
Peter Ebdon 4–3 Dave Harold
Mark Selby 4–1 Joe Delaney
Matthew Stevens 1–4 Liu Song

16 October:
Peter Ebdon 4–2 Mark Selby
Matthew Stevens 4–1 Dave Harold
Joe Delaney 2–4 Liu Song

Group 2D

13 October:
Shaun Murphy 4–0 Ben Woollaston
Ding Junhui 1–4 Marco Fu
Stuart Bingham 0–4 Stuart Pettman
Shaun Murphy 4–2 Stuart Pettman
Ding Junhui 1–4 Stuart Bingham
Marco Fu 4–3 Ben Woollaston

14 October:
Shaun Murphy 4–2 Stuart Bingham
Ding Junhui 4–0 Ben Woollaston
Stuart Pettman 4–3 Marco Fu
Shaun Murphy 3–4 Marco Fu
Ding Junhui 4–2 Stuart Pettman
Stuart Bingham 4–0 Ben Woollaston

15 October:
Shaun Murphy 4–3 Ding Junhui
Stuart Bingham 3–4 Marco Fu
Stuart Pettman 4–2 Ben Woollaston

Group 2E

15 October:
Graeme Dott 3–4 Ali Carter
Anthony Hamilton 3–4 Michael Holt
Fergal O'Brien 3–4 Marcus Campbell
Graeme Dott 2–4 Marcus Campbell
Ali Carter 4–1 Michael Holt
Anthony Hamilton 4–1 Fergal O'Brien

16 October:
Graeme Dott 0–4 Anthony Hamilton
Ali Carter 4–0 Marcus Campbell
Michael Holt 4–2 Fergal O'Brien

17 October:
Graeme Dott 1–4 Michael Holt
Ali Carter 4–0 Fergal O'Brien
Anthony Hamilton 3–4 Marcus Campbell
Graeme Dott 2–4 Fergal O'Brien
Ali Carter 4–0 Anthony Hamilton
Michael Holt 2–4 Marcus Campbell

Group 2F

15 October:
Ken Doherty 3–4 Michael Judge
Mark Williams 2–4 Mark Allen
Ian McCulloch 2–4 Ricky Walden

16 October:
Ken Doherty 0–4 Ricky Walden
Mark Williams 4–3 Ian McCulloch
Mark Allen 2–4 Michael Judge
Ken Doherty 3–4 Ian McCulloch
Mark Williams 4–2 Micheal Judge
Mark Allen 1–4 Ricky Walden

17 October:
Ken Doherty 3–4 Mark Allen
Mark Williams 3–4 Ricky Walden
Ian McCulloch 3–4 Michael Judge
Ken Doherty 4–1 Mark Williams
Ian McCulloch 2–4 Mark Allen
Ricky Walden 2–4 Michael Judge

Group 2G

15 October:
Stephen Hendry 2–4 Stephen Maguire
Barry Hawkins 4–2 Jamie Cope
Paul Davies 3–4 Rory McLeod
Stephen Hendry 4–2 Rory McLeod
Stephen Maguire 4–1 Jamie Cope
Barry Hawkins 4–2 Paul Davies

16 October:
Stephen Hendry 4–3 Barry Hawkins
Stephen Maguire 4–2 Rory McLeod
Jamie Cope 3–4 Paul Davies

17 October:
Stephen Hendry 4–3 Jamie Cope
Stephen Maguire 4–0 Paul Davies
Barry Hawkins 1–4 Rory McLeod
Stephen Hendry 3–4 Paul Davies
Stephen Maguire 1–4 Barry Hawkins
Jamie Cope 3–4 Rory McLeod

Group 2H

15 October:
John Higgins 4–2 Tian Pengfei
Ryan Day 4–2 Nigel Bond
Mark King 4–1 Andrew Norman

16 October:
John Higgins 4–0 Andrew Norman
Ryan Day 4–0 Mark King
Nigel Bond 4–2 Tian Pengfei
John Higgins 4–0 Mark King
Ryan Day 4–0 Tian Pengfei
Nigel Bond 4–0 Andrew Norman

17 October:
John Higgins 4–2 Nigel Bond
Ryan Day 3–4 Andrew Norman
Mark King 3–4 Tian Pengfei
John Higgins 4–2 Ryan Day
Mark King 4–0 Nigel Bond
Andrew Norman 2–4 Tian Pengfei

Knockout stage

Final

Qualifying
Qualifying for the 2007 Grand Prix was held between 17 September and 23 September 2007 at Pontin's Prestatyn using a round-robin format. The entries were placed into eight groups with the top 2 from each group qualifying for the finals in Aberdeen. All matches at this stage were played over the best of seven frames.

Group 1A

17 September:
Robert Milkins 4–2 Mark Davis
Jimmy White 4–3 Scott MacKenzie
Alex Davies 0–4 Mark Joyce
Jimmy Robertson 3–4 Supoj Saenla
Robert Milkins 3–4 Jimmy White
Mark Davis 4–1 Scott MacKenzie
Alex Davies 4–3 Jimmy Robertson
Mark Joyce 4–0 Supoj Saenla

18 September:
Robert Milkins 4–3 Scott MacKenzie
Mark Davis 4–0 Supoj Saenla
Jimmy White 4–0 Alex Davies
Mark Joyce 4–3 Jimmy Robertson
Robert Milkins 4–2 Alex Davies
Scott MacKenzie 4–3 Mark Joyce
Mark Davis 4–2 Jimmy Robertson
Jimmy White 4–3 Supoj Saenla

19 September:
Robert Milkins 4–3 Mark Joyce
Mark Davis 4–1 Jimmy White
Scott MacKenzie 3–4 Jimmy Robertson
Alex Davies 1–4 Supoj Saenla
Robert Milkins 1–4 Jimmy Robertson
Mark Davis 3–4 Alex Davies
Scott MacKenzie 4–3 Supoj Saenla
Jimmy White 2–4 Mark Joyce

20 September:
Robert Milkins 0–4 Supoj Saenla
Mark Davis 4–3 Mark Joyce
Jimmy White 2–4 Jimmy Robertson
Scott MacKenzie 2–4 Alex Davies

Group 1B

17 September:
Andrew Higginson 4–1 James Wattana
Tom Ford 4–1 Jimmy Michie
James McBain 1–4 Tony Drago
Michael White 1–4 Gareth Coppack
Andrew Higginson 1–4 Tom Ford
James Wattana 0–4 Jimmy Michie
James McBain 4–3 Michael White
Tony Drago 1–4 Gareth Coppack

18 September:
Andrew Higginson 2–4 Jimmy Michie
James Wattana 4–0 Gareth Coppack
Tom Ford 1–4 James McBain
Tony Drago 2–4 Michael White
Andrew Higginson 2–4 James McBain
Jimmy Michie 1–4 Tony Drago
James Wattana 4–3 Michael White
Tom Ford 4–0 Gareth Coppack

19 September:
Andrew Higginson 3–4 Tony Drago
James Wattana 2–4 Tom Ford
Jimmy Michie 4–2 Michael White
James McBain 4–0 Gareth Coppack
Andrew Higginson 4–0 Michael White
James Wattana 4–0 James McBain
Jimmy Michie 4–1 Gareth Coppack
Tom Ford 4–1 Tony Drago

20 September:
Andrew Higginson 4–0 Gareth Coppack
James Wattana 2–4 Tony Drago
Tom Ford 4–1 Michael White
Jimmy Michie 4–1 James McBain

Group 1C

17 September:
David Gilbert 4–2 David Gray
Barry Pinches 0–4 Joe Delaney
Leo Fernandez 2–4 Lee Spick
Issara Kachaiwong 3–4 Ben Woollaston
David Gilbert 4–1 Barry Pinches
David Gray 1–4 Joe Delaney
Leo Fernandez 2–4 Issara Kachaiwong
Lee Spick 4–2 Ben Woollaston

18 September:
David Gilbert 2–4 Joe Delaney
David Gray 1–4 Ben Woollaston
Barry Pinches 4–0 Leo Fernandez
Lee Spick 1–4 Issara Kachaiwong
David Gilbert 1–4 Leo Fernandez
Joe Delaney 4–3 Lee Spick
David Gray 3–4 Issara Kachaiwong
Barry Pinches 4–1 Ben Woollaston

19 September:
David Gilbert 4–0 Lee Spick
David Gray 4–2 Barry Pinches
Joe Delaney 4–2 Issara Kachaiwong
Leo Fernandez 3–4 Ben Woollaston
David Gilbert 4–2 Issara Kachaiwong
David Gray 4–2 Leo Fernandez
Joe Delaney 3–4 Ben Woollaston

Barry Pinches 4–2 Lee Spick
20 September:
David Gilbert 1–4 Ben Woollaston
David Gray 4–3 Lee Spick
Barry Pinches 4–0 Issara Kachaiwong
Joe Delaney 2–4 Leo Fernandez

Group 1D

17 September:
Jamie Burnett 4–3 Andy Hicks
Stuart Pettman 4–3 Mike Dunn
Kurt Maflin 2–4 Liu Song
Xiao Guodong 4–1 Ashley Wright
Jamie Burnett 3–4 Stuart Pettman
Andy Hicks 4–1 Mike Dunn
Kurt Maflin 3–4 Xiao Guodong
Liu Song 4–1 Ashley Wright

18 September:
Jamie Burnett 3–4 Mike Dunn
Andy Hicks 4–1 Ashley Wright
Stuart Pettman 4–3 Kurt Maflin
Liu Song 4–2 Xiao Guodong
Jamie Burnett 0–4 Kurt Maflin
Mike Dunn 1–4 Liu Song
Andy Hicks 4–2 Xiao Guodong
Stuart Pettman 4–0 Ashley Wright

19 September:
Jamie Burnett 4–3 Liu Song
Andy Hicks 1–4 Stuart Pettman
Mike Dunn 0–4 Xiao Guodong
Kurt Maflin 4–1 Ashley Wright
Jamie Burnett 4–1 Xiao Guodong
Andy Hicks 4–1 Kurt Maflin
Mike Dunn 4–1 Ashley Wright
Stuart Pettman 4–0 Liu Song

20 September:
Jamie Burnett 2–4 Ashley Wright
Andy Hicks 2–4 Liu Song
Stuart Pettman 4–2 Xiao Guodong
Mike Dunn 4–3 Kurt Maflin

Group 1E

20 September:
Fergal O'Brien 4–1 Michael Judge
David Roe 4–2 Drew Henry
Matthew Selt 3–4 Joe Jogia
Rodney Goggins 4–1 Kevin Van Hove

21 September:
Fergal O'Brien 4–0 David Roe
Michael Judge 4–1 Drew Henry
Matthew Selt 4–3 Rodney Goggins
Joe Jogia 4–1 Kevin Van Hove
Fergal O'Brien 2–4 Drew Henry
Michael Judge 4–2 Kevin van Hove
David Roe 4–2 Matthew Selt
Joe Jogia 1–4 Rodney Goggins

22 September:
Fergal O'Brien 4–2 Matthew Selt
Drew Henry 0–4 Joe Jogia
Michael Judge 4–1 Rodney Goggins
David Roe 4–1 Kevin Van Hove
Fergal O'Brien 4–3 Joe Jogia
Michael Judge 4–3 David Roe
Drew Henry 4–3 Rodney Goggins
Matthew Selt 4–1 Kevin Van Hove

23 September:
Fergal O'Brien 4–1 Rodney Goggins
Michael Judge 4–1 Matthew Selt
Drew Henry 1–4 Kevin Van Hove
David Roe 2–4 Joe Jogia
Fergal O'Brien 4–1 Kevin Van Hove
Michael Judge 4–1 Joe Jogia
David Roe 4–1 Rodney Goggins
Drew Henry 0–4 Matthew Selt

Group 1F

20 September:
John Parrott 1–4 Ricky Walden
Robin Hull 1–4 Marcus Campbell
Munraj Pal 4–3 David Morris
Steve Mifsud 1–4 Martin Gould

21 September:
John Parrott 0–4 Robin Hull
Ricky Walden 1–4 Marcus Campbell
Munraj Pal 3–4 Steve Mifsud
David Morris 3–4 Martin Gould
John Parrott 2–4 Marcus Campbell
Ricky Walden 4–2 Martin Gould
Robin Hull 4–3 Munraj Pal
David Morris 4–3 Steve Mifsud

22 September:
John Parrott 1–4 Munraj Pal
Marcus Campbell 2–4 David Morris
Ricky Walden 4–2 Steve Mifsud
David Roe 3–4 Martin Gould
John Parrott 0–4 David Morris
Ricky Walden 4–3 Robin Hull
Marcus Campbell 4–0 Steve Mifsud
Munraj Pal 4–3 Martin Gould

23 September:
John Parrott 4–2 Steve Mifsud
Ricky Walden 4–1 Munraj Pal
Marcus Campbell 4–0 Martin Gould
Robin Hull 4–3 David Morris
John Parrott 0–4 Martin Gould
Ricky Walden 4–3 David Morris
Robin Hull 4–1 Steve Mifsud
Marcus Campbell 1–4 Munraj Pal

Group 1G

20 September:
Alan McManus 3–4 Adrian Gunnell
Paul Davies 4–1 Ian Preece
Lee Walker 4–3 Tian Pengfei
Liu Chuang 3–4 Fraser Patrick

21 September:
Alan McManus 0–4 Paul Davies
Adrian Gunnell 0–4 Ian Preece
Lee Walker 4–0 Liu Chuang
Tian Pengfei 4–2 Fraser Patrick
Alan McManus 1–4 Ian Preece
Adrian Gunnell 4–2 Fraser Patrick
Paul Davies 4–0 Lee Walker
Tian Pengfei 4–3 Liu Chuang.

22 September:
Alan McManus 4–3 Lee Walker
Ian Preece 2–4 Tian Pengfei
Adrian Gunnell 1–4 Liu Chuang
Paul Davies 3–4 Fraser Patrick
Alan McManus 3–4 Tian Pengfei
Adrian Gunnell 1–4 Paul Davies
Ian Preece 2–4 Liu Chuang
Lee Walker 2–4 Fraser Patrick

23 September:
Alan McManus 4–3 Liu Chuang
Adrian Gunnell 0–4 Lee Walker
Ian Preece 0–4 Fraser Patrick
Paul Davies 2–4 Tian Pengfei
Alan McManus 4–1 Fraser Patrick
Adrian Gunnell 4–1 Tian Pengfei
Paul Davies 4–1 Liu Chuang
Ian Preece 4–0 Lee Walker

Group 1H

20 September:
Andrew Norman 1–4 Rory McLeod
Judd Trump 4–2 Rod Lawler
Jamie O'Neill 1–4 Liang Wenbo
Alfred Burden 0–4 Patrick Wallace

21 September:
Andrew Norman 4–1 Judd Trump
Rory McLeod 4–1 Rod Lawler
Jamie O'Neill 0–4 Alfred Burden
Liang Wenbo 4–3 Patrick Wallace
Andrew Norman 4–3 Rod Lawler
Rory McLeod 2–4 Patrick Wallace
Judd Trump 4–2 Jamie O'Neill
Liang Wenbo 0–4 Alfred Burden

22 September:
Andrew Norman 4–1 Jamie O'Neill
Rod Lawler 3–4 Liang Wenbo
Rory McLeod 4–2 Alfred Burden
Judd Trump 4–2 Patrick Wallace
Andrew Norman 4–2 Liang Wenbo
Rory McLeod 4–2 Judd Trump
Rod Lawler 4–1 Alfred Burden
Jamie O'Neill 2–4 Patrick Wallace

23 September:
Andrew Norman 4–0 Alfred Burden
Rory McLeod 4–0 Jamie O'Neill
Rod Lawler 3–4 Patrick Wallace
Judd Trump 3–4 Liang Wenbo
Andrew Norman 4–1 Patrick Wallace
Rory McLeod 1–4 Liang Wenbo
Judd Trump 1–4 Alfred Burden
Rod Lawler 3–4 Jamie O'Neill

Century breaks

Qualifying stage centuries

147, 126, 108  Jamie Burnett
142  Issara Kachaiwong
141  Xiao Guodong
140, 133, 117, 102  Liu Song
136  David Gray
135  Alex Davies
133  Jimmy White
132, 100  Fergal O'Brien
132  David Gilbert
130  Scott MacKenzie
129, 128, 118  Tom Ford
128, 127  Rod Lawler
128, 108  Tony Drago
128  David Roe
127, 125, 121, 112, 102  Mark Davis
127, 125, 103  Kurt Maflin
126, 122, 101, 100  Robin Hull
122  Andy Hicks
121, 116  Andrew Higginson
119, 110  Judd Trump
119  Rory McLeod
115, 107  Marcus Campbell
113  David Morris
112, 111  Ricky Walden
112, 107  Supoj Saenla
112  Adrian Gunnell
111, 100  Munraj Pal
107  Michael Judge
106  Liang Wenbo
106  Matthew Selt
105  Steve Mifsud
103  James McBain
103  Stuart Pettman
103  Drew Henry
102, 101  Leo Fernandez
100  Jimmy Michie

Televised stage centuries

147, 122, 117, 113, 104  Tom Ford
143, 111, 110  Dave Harold
138, 119  Anthony Hamilton
138, 108  Shaun Murphy
138  Jamie Cope
137, 135, 127, 125, 123, 119, 100  Ronnie O'Sullivan
134, 110, 107, 103  Peter Ebdon
134  Michael Judge
133, 119, 117, 110, 109, 106, 105, 103, 101  Marco Fu
133  Graeme Dott
131, 102  Mark Selby
130, 104, 104  Stephen Maguire
124, 103  Stuart Bingham
123, 101  Gerard Greene
119, 112, 110, 107  John Higgins
114, 107, 100  Ryan Day
113, 112, 102  Liu Song
113  Nigel Bond
112, 101  Ali Carter
103  Stephen Hendry
102  Tian Pengfei
102  Mark Allen
101  Marcus Campbell
100  Stuart Pettman

References

2007
Grand Prix
Grand Prix (snooker)
Snooker competitions in Scotland